Leonard Frederick Marlow (30 April 1899 – 1975) was a professional footballer who played for Huddersfield Town and Torquay United. He was born in Putney. Huddersfield signed him from Kingstonian F.C. in 1921–22 season having scored 20 goals in 17 appearances for the Athenian League club. He later played for Torquay United between 1925 and 1927, becoming joint top scorer for the 1926–27 season.

References

1899 births
1975 deaths
People from Putney
English footballers
Association football forwards
English Football League players
Huddersfield Town A.F.C. players
Torquay United F.C. players